Stormswept is a 1923 silent film starring brothers Wallace Beery and Noah Beery. The advertising phrase used for the movie was "Wallace and Noah Beery, The Two Greatest Character Actors on the American Screen." The film was written by Winifred Dunn from the H. H. Van Loan story, and directed by Robert Thornby. A print of the film survives in London's BFI National Archive.

Plot
As described in a film magazine, William McCabe (Wallace Beery) is a bitter man seeking solitude in which to forget the wife whom he loved and who betrayed him. He wanders about the waterfront and, seeing a man falling from the deck, rescues him. The two become friends and when the rescued man, Shark Moran (Noah Beery), learns that William wants solitude, he suggests that he take a job on a lightship as he is its captain. "You will find solitude there," he says. William takes the job and the monotony of the life has upset the minds of many of the men who live on the Relief. There a tug that brings supplies the lightship also brings a ray of hope to William in the form of a beautiful young woman, Ann Reynolds (Faire), who is the daughter of the master of the tug. But William does not know if his wife is alive or dead, so his moodiness deepens. One day a small boat occupied by a young woman is sighted drifting near the lightship, and the captain goes out to give help. He brings the woman back to the Relief, thinking he finds favor in her eyes. However, this assumption is without grounds and his spurned advances lead to a fight between Shark Moran and William, who is shocked to see the woman is Hedda (Pretty), the wife who deserted him. The captain then apologises to William, and their friendship is renewed. The unfaithful wife then departs, and William looks forward to his suit of the woman of the supply tug.

Cast
Wallace Beery as William McCabe
Noah Beery as Shark Moran
Virginia Browne Faire as Ann Reynolds
Arline Pretty as Hedda McCabe
Jack Carlyle as Snape

See also
Godless Men (1920)
Code of the Sea (1924)
Rugged Water (1925)
Sensation Seekers (1927)
The Perfect Storm (2000)

References

External links

1923 films
American silent feature films
American black-and-white films
Silent American drama films
Film Booking Offices of America films
1923 drama films
1920s American films